The Census Taker is a 1984 black comedy directed by Bruce R. Cook.  It stars Greg Mullavey, Meredith MacRae, Timothy Bottoms, and Garrett Morris.  The film was The Residents' first film soundtrack commission when their participation was suggested by Penn Jillette to Cook.  It was released by Trans World Entertainment on VHS in 1989 under the title Husbands, Wives, Money & Murder.

Plot
When George (Greg Mullavey) and Martha (Meredith MacRae) let Harvey (Garrett Morris), an annoying census taker, into their home, they find themselves under a barrage of increasingly abusive questions.  Furious at his intrusiveness, and at their wit's end, they kill the census taker and with the help of their friends Pete (Timothy Bottoms) and Eva (Austen Tayler), must hide the body from a determined investigator. The film ended in a freeze-frame when Eva and Martha breathed and cried off-screen. (Note: They breathed on-screen, and they cried off-screen)

Cast
 Greg Mullavey as George
 Meredith MacRae as Martha
 Garrett Morris as Harvey
 Timothy Bottoms as Pete
 Jennifer Finch as Punk Girl
 Troy Alexander as Edward
 Erin-Bruce Tolcharian as Robert
 William R. Bremer as Sheriff

References

External links
The Census Taker at the Internet Movie Database
Husbands, Wives, Money, and Murder at Rotten Tomatoes
Husbands, Wives, Money, and Murder at film.com
Husbands, Wives, Money, and Murder at movieretriever.com

American television films
American black comedy films
1984 television films
1984 films
1980s English-language films
1980s American films
Films scored by musical groups